The Craig Memorial Cup, also known as the William Craig Memorial Cup is an intermediate football competition in Northern Ireland run by the North West of Ireland Football Association. The competition culminates in the final which has traditionally been played on Boxing Day. The current champions are Maiden City.

Past winners

 1980–81 Tobermore United
 1981–82 Moyola Park
 1982–83 Roe Valley
 1983–84 Dungiven
 1984–85 Coleraine Reserves
 1985–86 Portstewart
 1986–87 Coleraine Reserves
 1987–88 Strabane
 1988–89 Tobermore United
 1989–90 Tobermore United
 1990–91 Macosquin
 1991–92 Park
 1992–93 Limavady United
 1993–94 Limavady United
 1994–95 Limavady United
 1995–96 Oxford United Stars
 1996–97 Drummond United
 1997–98 Tobermore United
 1998–99 Institute
 1999–00 Drummond United
 2000–01 Moyola Park
 2001–02 Moyola Park
 2002–03 Moyola Park
 2003–04 Strabane
 2004–05 Moyola Park
 2005–06 Moyola Park
 2006–07 Tobermore United
 2007–08 Portstewart
 2008–09 Limavady United
 2009–10 Tobermore United
 2010–11 Limavady United
 2011–12 Institute
 2012–13 Limavady United
 2013–14 Coleraine Reserves
 2014–15 Limavady United
 2015–16 Limavady United
 2016–17 Limavady United
 2017–18 Maiden City
 2018–19 Maiden City
 2019–20 Portstewart
 2020–21 Not played
 2021–22 Portstewart
 2022–23 Maiden City

Performance by club

See also
Steel & Sons Cup
Bob Radcliffe Cup
Fermanagh & Western Intermediate Cup
North West Senior Cup

References

Association football cup competitions in Northern Ireland